The Gonzalez Hontoria de 12 cm mod 1883 was a Spanish naval gun developed in the late 1800s that armed a variety of warships of the Spanish Navy during the Spanish–American War.

History 
The Hontoria guns were designed by José González Hontoria a Spanish inventor, field marshal of marine infantry and brigadier of the navy. During the 1800s Spain lagged behind other European powers in industrialization and Spain imported weapons from Krupp, Armstrong Whitworth and Schneider et Cie.  During the 1860s and 1870s, Hontoria studied explosives, metallurgy, and industrial production with the aim of developing an indigenous arms industry.

Construction 
The 1879 series like Ordóñez guns of the same period were breech loading, black powder, built up guns, with steel A tube and cast iron reinforcing hoops. The 1883 series was a step forward in that they were breech loading, built up guns, with forged steel A tube and forged steel reinforcing hoops. They were produced by the Arsenal de la Carraca in Cadiz and the Royal Ordnance Works at Trubia in Asturias. During the 1890s some 12 cm, 14 cm and 16 cm were converted to quick fire guns with assistance from Schneider et Cie.

Criticisms of the 1883 series guns:
 Outdated design - Some argue that the 1883 series production methods were outdated compared to its European rivals.  The counter argument is Spain only recently switched to producing steel weapons and purchasing a foreign design would do nothing to promote self-sufficiency in weapons design and production.  Also that the cost of retooling to produce another design would have meant that recent infrastructure improvements were a wasted investment.
 Slow rate of fire - Some argue that the 1883 series should have been designed as quick firing weapons from the beginning and that attempts to convert them to quick firing were unsuccessful.  The counter argument is that Spain didn't have that experience and it would have meant delaying production schedules when they were already delayed due to insufficient industrial capacity.
 Short barrel length -  Some argue that the 35 caliber length was too short when compared to its European rivals who were producing 45 caliber guns and that the short barrel length didn't leverage the power of new smokeless powders efficiently.  The counter argument is that Spanish industry didn't have the capacity to produce longer barrels, having only recently switched to steel production.  Also that the powders of the time needed reformulation to increase efficiency and increasing barrel length was only partial fix.

Naval use 
12 cm Hontoria 1883 guns armed a variety of ships such as ironclads, protected cruisers, torpedo gunboats and unprotected cruisers of the Spanish Navy.

Ironclad battleships
 Spanish battleship Pelayo - This ship had a tertiary armament of twelve casemated 12 cm guns in single mounts amidships. The Pelayo saw no action during the Spanish–American War.

Protected cruisers
 Isla de Luzon class - The three ships of this class had a primary armament of six 12 cm guns in single shielded mounts. Two were mounted fore, two amidships and two aft. Two ships of this class Isla de Cuba and Isla de Luzón were scuttled during the Battle of Manila Bay and later raised, repaired and commissioned into the US Navy under their old names.
 Reina Regente class - The three ships of this class had a secondary armament of six 12 cm guns in sponsons amidships.

Torpedo gunboats
 Maria de Molina class - The three ships of this class had a primary armament of two 12 cm guns in single shielded mounts fore and aft of the ship superstructure.
 Temerario class - The six ships of this class had a primary armament of two 12 cm guns in single shielded mounts fore and aft of the ship superstructure.

Unprotected cruisers
 Velasco-class - Six of the eight ships of this class had a primary armament of four 12 cm guns in single shielded mounts amidships. Three of the ships of this class Don Juan de Austria, Don Antonio de Ulloa and Velasco were sunk during the Spanish–American War. Don Juan de Austria was raised, repaired and commissioned into the US Navy under its old name.

Ammunition 

The gun was able to fire:
 Armor Piercing
 Common

Photo gallery

References

Notes

External links 
 http://sci.military.naval.narkive.com/l1M7GqCr/need-1890-s-french-naval-ordnance-info
 http://www.ejercitos.org/2016/12/08/jose-gonzalez-hontoria/
 http://vidamaritima.com/2008/07/el-brigadier-gonzalez-hontoria/

120 mm artillery